Morning Bay is a suburb and adjoining bay in northern Sydney, in the state of New South Wales, Australia. Morning Bay is located 40 kilometres north of the Sydney central business district, in the local government area of Northern Beaches Council.

Morning Bay is located in Ku-ring-gai Chase National Park, on the western shores of Pittwater.

References

Suburbs of Sydney
Bays of New South Wales
Northern Beaches Council